Gardenia faucicola is a species of plant in the family Rubiaceae native to northern Australia.

References

faucicola
Plants described in 1997